Chadwick is a lunar impact crater that lies on the far side of the Moon's surface, just beyond the southwestern limb. It is located to the northwest of the crater De Roy, and was previously designated De Roy X before being given its current name by the IAU. This region of the lunar surface lies at the southern end of the ejecta blanket that surrounds the Mare Orientale impact basin.

Chadwick is roughly circular with a sharp-edged rim. The inner wall is somewhat wider to the south-southeast, giving the crater a slight outward bulge toward De Roy. The rim has not been significantly worn, and is not marked by any impacts of note. The interior surface has a somewhat uneven appearance.

This crater lies within the Mendel-Rydberg Basin, a 630 km wide impact basin of Nectarian age.

References

 
 
 
 
 
 
 
 
 
 
 
 

Impact craters on the Moon